Listen is an album recorded and released by Jordan Rudess in 1993.

This is Rudess' second studio album, his first being Arrival released in 1988.  In 1994 Jordan was named "Best New Talent" by Keyboard Magazine.  The award was given to him based upon his live performances and this album.

Track listing
All pieces are composed by Jordan Rudess.
"Listen to the Voice" – 3:52
"Inspiration" – 5:15
"Beyond the Shoreline" – 4:33
"Fade Away" – 4:32
"It's a Mystery" – 6:47
"Feel the Magic" – 6:26
"Invisible Child" – 5:59
"Across the Sky" – 7:17
"Take Time" – 7:47
"Danielle" – 5:19
"Boogie Wacky Woogie" – 2:31

Personnel
Jordan Rudess – keyboards, vocals
Barbara Bock – vocals
Jim Simmons – Bass
Chris Amelar – Guitar
Ken Mary – drums

1993 albums
Jordan Rudess albums